The Kolss Cycling Team were a Ukrainian UCI Continental cycling team. It took part in the UCI Europe Tour before disbanding at the end of 2017.

2017 team roster
As at 31 December 2017

Major wins

2011
Stage 5 Okolo Slovenska, Mykhaylo Kononenko
Stage 4 Tour of Szeklerland, Anatoliy Sosnitskiy

2012
Stage 4 Grand Prix of Sochi, Mykhaylo Kononenko
Stages 2, 4 & 6 Romanian Cycling Tour, Andriy Kulyk

2013
Overall Grand Prix of Sochi, Vitaliy Buts
Stage 4, Vitaliy Buts
Overall Grand Prix of Adygeya, Andriy Khripta
Stage 3, Vitaliy Buts
Mayor Cup, Vitaliy Buts
Prologue (ITT) Five Rings of Moscow, Andriy Vasylyuk
Stage 1 Five Rings of Moscow, Vitaliy Buts
Race Horizon Park 1, Denys Kostyuk
Race Horizon Park 2, Mykhaylo Kononenko
 National Under-23 Time Trial Championships, Oleksandr Golovash
 National Time Trial Championships, Andriy Vasylyuk
 National Road Race Championships, Denys Kostyuk
Overall Romanian Cycling Tour, Vitaliy Buts
Prologue, Team time trial
Stage 4, Vitaliy Buts
Stage 1 Tour of Szeklerland, Vitaliy Buts
Stage 1b Tour of Bulgaria, Vitaliy Buts

2014
Race Horizon Park 1, Vitaliy Buts
Race Horizon Park 2, Mykhaylo Kononenko
Race Horizon Park 3, Denys Kostyuk
Overall Okolo Slovenska, Oleksandr Polivoda
Stage 2, Oleksandr Polivoda
Stage 5, Andriy Kulyk
 National Time Trial Championships, Andriy Vasylyuk
 National Road Race Championships, Vitaliy Buts
Overall Tour of Qinghai Lake, Mykhaylo Kononenko
Stage 1, Oleksandr Polivoda
Stage 3, Mykhaylo Kononenko
Stage 8, Sergiy Lagkuti
Stage 1 Tour of Szeklerland, Oleksandr Golovash
Stages 1 & 3 Baltic Chain Tour, Mykhaylo Kononenko
Stage 4 Tour of China I,  Vitaliy Buts

2015
Overall Tour of Mersin, Oleksandr Polivoda
Stage 1, Oleksandr Polivoda
Stage 3, Mykhaylo Kononenko
Stage 4, Vitaliy Buts
Moscow Cup, Sergiy Lagkuti
Memorial Oleg Dyachenko, Mykhaylo Kononenko
Stage 1 Szlakiem Grodów Piastowskich, Andriy Kulyk
Overall Five Rings of Moscow, Oleksandr Polivoda
Stage 2, Mykhaylo Kononenko
Stage 3, Oleksandr Polivoda
Grand Prix of Vinnytsia, Vitaliy Buts
Horizon Park Race for Peace, Sergiy Lagkuti
Horizon Park Race Maidan, Oleksandr Polivoda
Horizon Park Classic, Mykhaylo Kononenko
Memorial Grundmanna I Wizowskiego, Adam Stachowiak
 National Time Trial Championships, Sergiy Lagkuti
 National Road Race Championships, Mykhaylo Kononenko
Minsk Cup, Oleksandr Golovash
Stage 3 Tour of Qinghai Lake, Oleksandr Polivoda
Overall Podlasie Tour, Andriy Vasylyuk
Prologue (ITT) Mazovia Tour, Konrad Tomasiak
Odessa Grand Prix 1, Oleksandr Polivoda
Odessa Grand Prix 2, Vitaliy Buts
Stage 3b Tour of Szeklerland, Oleksandr Golovash
Overall Baltic Chain Tour, Andriy Kulyk
Stage 2, Andriy Kulyk
Overall Black Sea Cycling Tour, Vitaliy Buts
Stages 1 & 2, Vitaliy Buts

2016
Belgrade–Banja Luka I, Vitaliy Buts
GP Slovakia, Andriy Kulyk
Memoriał Romana Siemińskiego, Mykhaylo Kononenko
Overall Szlakiem Grodów Piastowskich, Oleksandr Polivoda
Stage 1, Oleksandr Polivoda
Horizon Park Race for Peace, Vitaliy Buts
Horizon Park Classic, Mykhaylo Kononenko
Overall Tour of Ukraine, Sergiy Lagkuti
Stage 1, Sergiy Lagkuti
Stage 2a (TTT)
 National Time Trial Championships, Andriy Vasylyuk
 National Road Race Championships, Oleksandr Polivoda

2017
Overall Tour of Ukraine, Vitaliy Buts
Stage 1, Vitaliy Buts
Stage 2 (TTT)
Horizon Park Race for Peace, Mykhaylo Kononenko
 National Time Trial Championships, Oleksandr Polivoda
 National Road Race Championships, Vitaliy Buts
Stage 7 Tour of Qinghai Lake, Mykhaylo Kononenko
Stages 8 & 9 Tour of Qinghai Lake, Oleksandr Polivoda
Prologue Dookoła Mazowsza, Adrian Banaszek
Tour de Ribas, Sergiy Lagkuti

National champions
2013
 Ukrainian U23 Road Race, Oleksandr Golovash
 Ukrainian Road Race, Denys Kostyuk
 Ukrainian Time Trial, Andriy Vasylyuk

2014
 Ukrainian Time Trial, Andriy Vasylyuk
 Ukrainian Road Race, Vitaliy Buts

2015
 Ukrainian Road Race, Mykhaylo Kononenko
 Ukrainian Time Trial, Sergiy Lagkuti

2016
 Ukrainian Road Race, Oleksandr Polivoda
 Ukrainian Time Trial, Andriy Vasylyuk

2017
 Ukrainian Time Trial, Oleksandr Polivoda
 Ukrainian U23 Road Race, Vladyslav Soltasiuk

See also

References

External links

UCI Continental Teams (Europe)
Defunct cycling teams based in Ukraine
Cycling teams established in 2010
Cycling teams disestablished in 2017
2010 establishments in Ukraine
2017 disestablishments in Ukraine